I is the debut studio album by Canadian hardcore punk band Cursed, released on February 25, 2003 via Deathwish Inc. (The title is rendered as "One" on the sleeve of the reissued album, and the context provided by the album's successors, II and III, reinforces the interpretation of the title as the Roman numeral.)  It was recorded at Chemical Sound in Toronto, from October 19 to October 23, 2002. It received moderate critical acclaim. The album was reissued on vinyl by Trash Art! in 2007.

Track listing
 Polygraph - 1:25
 God and Country - 4:16
 Promised Land - 1:00
 Bloody Mary - 2:03
 How Great Things Happen When You Give Up Hope - 6:32
 Nineteen Seventy Four - 2:50
 Negative Two Point Five - 2:05
 Guilt Parade - 3:14
 Another Day - 0:58
 Opposable Thumbs - 6:55
 Pariah - 1:14
 This Time Next Year (aka Dead or Alive) (unreleased track) - 2:08

Cultural reference
The song "God and Country" contains a reference to CCR's Fortunate Son (the line "some folks inherit star-spangled eyes").

References

2003 debut albums
Cursed (band) albums
Deathwish Inc. albums
Albums produced by Kurt Ballou
Albums with cover art by Jacob Bannon